Betzaida Ubri Mateo (born 9 May 1990) is a Dominican footballer who plays for WPSL team Treasure Coast Dynamites as a forward.

External links 
 
 :es:Selección femenina de fútbol de la República Dominicana

1990 births
Living people
People from Comendador, Dominican Republic
Dominican Republic women's footballers
Women's association football forwards
Women's Premier Soccer League Elite players
Dominican Republic women's international footballers
Competitors at the 2014 Central American and Caribbean Games
Dominican Republic expatriate women's footballers
Dominican Republic expatriate sportspeople in the United States
Expatriate women's soccer players in the United States